St John of God Murdoch Hospital is a 511-bed private non-profit hospital located in the southern suburbs of Perth in Western Australia, immediately adjacent to the public Fiona Stanley Hospital campus.

Established in 1994, the hospital services the southern suburbs of Perth. It provides comprehensive hospital services for more than 50,000 patients each year, with the emergency department.

St John of God Murdoch Hospital is a division of St John of God Health Care.

Facilities
St John of God Murdoch Hospital has 511 inpatient beds, a 24-hour emergency department, 16 operating theatres, five endoscopy suites, two angiography suites, birth suite, maternity ward, hydrotherapy pool, medical library and education centre.

Services
Services provided by St John of God Murdoch Hospital include the following:
 a 24-hour Emergency Department
 medical and surgical services
 paediatrics
 maternity
 palliative care
 critical and coronary care
 cancer treatment

St John of God Murdoch Community Hospice 
Located on the grounds of St John of God Murdoch Hospital, the purpose-built, 20-bed Murdoch Community Hospice provides specialist palliative care to patients in Perth's southern suburbs. Funding for the $5m Murdoch Community Hospice was raised by the St John of God Foundation.

Education
St John of God Murdoch Hospital has affiliations with a number of teaching institutions, including The University of Western Australia, Challenger Institute of Technology, Edith Cowan University and the University of Notre Dame Australia.

Redevelopment

In 2014, the hospital finished the first stage of a $200+ million redevelopment project, which included adding 174 beds, eight new theatres, a cancer centre including 20-place chemotherapy unit, multi-storey medical centre, 30-place endoscopy unit, pathology laboratory, birthing suite and 450 new parking bays.

Stage two of the redevelopment included a new Chapel and refurbished main entrance and foyer. The hospital's north wing wards are also being refurbished.

Social outreach 
St John of God Raphael Services in Fremantle and Cockburn provides perinatal infant mental health care and undertakes research. Staffed by mental health clinicians, Raphael Services provide free support for parents and families affected by anxiety, depression and other mental health difficulties during pregnancy and in the postnatal period. The services also provide counselling and support for parents undergoing prenatal testing or who have experienced pregnancy loss.

St John of God Health Care also delivers community mental health support in Murdoch through its Social Outreach services.

Murdoch Community Mental Health provides specialised care to the local community and offers holistic, professional and compassionate care tailored to individual needs.

See also
List of hospitals in Australia
List of hospitals in New Zealand

References

External links

Sisters of St John of God website

Hospital buildings completed in 1994
Hospitals established in 1994
Hospitals in Perth, Western Australia
Murdoch, Western Australia
St John of God Health Care